The Star Kingdom Stakes is an Australian Turf Club Group 3 Thoroughbred quality handicap horse race, for horses aged three years old and upwards, over a distance of 1200 metres, held annually at Rosehill Racecourse in Sydney, Australia. Total prize money for the race is A$160,000.

History

The registered race is named in honour of Star Kingdom, the five times Leading sire in Australia and sire of the winner of the first five Golden Slipper Stakes.

The race has been run as the Sebring Stakes between 2010–14 in honour of Sebring winner of the 2008 Golden Slipper Stakes. The race reverted to the registered race name in 2015 while the Listed race registered as the Darby Munro Stakes, was run as The Sebring.

Name
1979–1999 - Star Kingdom Stakes
2000–2004 - Star Kingdom Quality Stakes
2005–2008 - Nivea Visage Stakes
 2009 - Star Kingdom Stakes
2010–2012 - Sebring Stakes
 2013 - Sebring HKJC Stakes
 2014 - Sebring Stakes
 2015 - Star Kingdom Stakes

Distance
1979–2007 – 1200 metres
 2008 – 1200 metres (held at Canterbury)
2009–2012 – 1100 metres 
 2013 onwards – 1200 metres

Grade
1979–1987 - Listed Race
1988 onwards - Group 3

Venue

2022 - Newcastle Racecourse

Winners

 2022 - Gem Song   
 2021 - Signore Fox
2020 - Vegadaze
2019 - Siren’s Fury
2018 - Spright
2017 - Jungle Edge
2016 - Malaguerra
 2015 - Generalife
 2014 - Flamberge
 2013 - Hot Snitzel
 2012 - Zaratone
 2011 - Swift Alliance
 2010 - Swift Alliance
 2009 - The Jackal
 2008 - Hoystar
 2007 - Posadas
 2006 - Mustard
 2005 - Red Oog
 2004 - Taikun
 2003 - Bradshaw
 2002 - Bradshaw
 2001 - Camena
 2000 - King Of Acapulco
 1999 - Return To Go
 1998 - Hockney
 1997 - Citi Success
 1996 - Moss Rocket
 1995 - Legal Agent
 1994 - Jetball
 1993 - Friend's Venture
 1992 - Friend's Venture
 1991 - Kessem
 1990 - Investor
 1989 - Magic Gleam
 1988 - Lunch On Sunday 
 1987 - Targlish
 1986 - At Sea
 1985 - Gunyatti
 1984 - Manuan
 1983 - Bronze Spirit
 1982 - Bold Jet
 1981 - Bemboka Yacht
 1980 - Radiant Echo 
 1979 - The Judge

See also
 List of Australian Group races
 Group races

External links 
Sebring Stakes (ATC)

References

Horse races in Australia